This is a list of the  broad gauge locomotives of the Great Western Railway. It excludes those purchased from constituent companies, or acquired through amalgamations.

Notes

References